Donald Glenn Elliott (born September 20, 1968) is a former right-handed Major League Baseball relief pitcher who played from 1994 to 1995 for the San Diego Padres.

Philadelphia Phillies
Prior to being drafted by the Philadelphia Phillies in the seventh round of the 1987 draft, Elliott attended Deer Park High School and then San Jacinto College. He began his professional career in 1988, as a starting pitcher. Pitching for the Martinsville Phillies, he went 4–2 with a 3.66 ERA, striking out 77 batters in 59 innings pitched that season.

In 1989, he pitched for the Batavia Clippers and Spartanburg Phillies, going a combined 6–4 with a 1.88. He did not play affiliated professional baseball in 1990 due to injury.

Splitting the 1991 season between the Spartanburg Phillies and Clearwater Phillies, Elliott went a combined 11–9 with a 3.25 ERA. On December 9, he was drafted by the Seattle Mariners in the Rule 5 draft, however he was returned to the Phillies on April 1, 1992.

Major league season
On May 28, 1992, he was traded to the Atlanta Braves for Ben Rivera. In 103 innings with the Greenville Braves, he went 7–2 with a 2.08 ERA. Ranked the ninth best prospect in the Braves organization by Baseball America prior to the 1993 season, he began the year with the Richmond Braves, going 8–5 with a 4.72 ERA with them. On July 18, his was traded to the Padres with Melvin Nieves and minor leaguer Vince Moore for Fred McGriff. He spent the rest of the year with the Las Vegas Stars, going 2–5 with a 6.37 ERA. Overall,. he went 10–10 with a 5.19 ERA.

April 23, 1994 marked the date of Elliott's major league debut. It would end up being his only big league start. Coincidentally, the opposing team he was facing was the team that originally drafted him, the Phillies. Even more coincidentally, he was facing the pitcher he was traded for on May 28, 1992, Ben Rivera. Neither pitcher fared very well in that game, with Elliott lasting only 2 innings, giving up two earned runs, four hits and two walks. Rivera lasted four innings, allowing seven hits, five earned runs and four walks. In the end, the Padres won the game 8–2. After being converted to a reliever, Elliott did much better, finishing the season with a 3.27 ERA in 30 total games, with his ERA as a reliever being 2.97.

Later career
He made only one appearance in the majors in 1995, on September 19. In two innings, he allowed two hits and one walk, while striking out three batters. He allowed zero earned runs. That would be the final game of his big league career. In the minors that season, he spent seven games with the Las Vegas Stars, posting a 4.50 ERA in eight innings.

Even though his big league career was over, he stuck around in the minors for a while. In 1996, he was back in the Phillies organization, pitching for the Scranton/Wilkes-Barre Red Barons. He went 5–11 with a 4.79 ERA as a starter. He did not play affiliated baseball in 1997, and in 1998 he played his final season, this time in the Texas Rangers organization. Pitching for the Tulsa Drillers, he went 1–1 with a 5.79 ERA in 20 relief appearances.

Overall, he appeared in 31 games in the majors, making 1 start and going 0–1 with a 3.09 ERA.

Technique
One day during the 1994 season, Elliott's teammate, Trevor Hoffman asked Elliott how he threw his change-up. Elliott showed Hoffman his usual grip of pinching his index finger and thumb together at the point of release. Hoffman perfected this pitch and credits this usual grip as helping him master one of the nastiest change-ups in the major leagues.  Elliott is now teaching his change-up to high school pitchers as he is currently the assistant head baseball coach at Deer Park High School in the Deer Park Independent School District. Elliott was a high school teammate of former Philadelphia Eagles defensive lineman Tommy Jeter and New York Yankees pitcher Andy Pettitte.

References

External links

1968 births
Living people
Baseball players from Texas
Batavia Clippers players
Bayou Bullfrogs players
Clearwater Phillies players
Greenville Braves players
Las Vegas Stars (baseball) players
Major League Baseball pitchers
Martinsville Phillies players
People from Pasadena, Texas
Reading Phillies players
Richmond Braves players
San Diego Padres players
San Jacinto College alumni
San Jacinto North Gators baseball players
Scranton/Wilkes-Barre Red Barons players
Spartanburg Phillies players
Sportspeople from Harris County, Texas
Tulsa Drillers players